César Osvaldo Villaluz Martínez (born 18 July 1988) is a Mexican professional footballer who plays as a midfielder for Cancún.

At age seventeen, he participated in the U-17 World Cup with the Mexico national team. His efforts as midfielder assisted the team to victory against Brazil, as well as throughout the entire tournament. Fellow team players Carlos Vela and Giovani dos Santos, both of whom are younger than he, played with him in the 2007 FIFA U-20 World Cup that took place in Canada in 2007. The Mexico national team faced off against the national football teams of Portugal, Gambia, New Zealand, in that order in the group round; Mexico was eliminated by Argentina.

Skills 
Villaluz is known for his quick rapid speed and great control while dribbling the ball. What he lacks in height is compensated for by his agility and ability to take on multiple players at once.

International 
Villaluz was one of the young Mexicans that won the 2005 FIFA U-17 world cup in Peru. In 2007 most of the U-17 players gathered to try to win the 2007 Canada U-20 World Cup. César's first goal with the senior national team was in a friendly against Guatemala which resulted in a 3–2 loss for Mexico. His second goal for Mexico came in a friendly against China.

Career stats

International goals 

|-
| 1. || 17 October 2007 || Los Angeles Memorial Coliseum, Los Angeles, United States ||  || 2–3 || Loss || Friendly
|-
| 2. || 16 April 2008 || Qwest Field, Seattle, United States ||  || 1–0 || Win || Friendly
|}

International appearances 
As of 11 March 2009

Honours 
Mexico U17
FIFA U-17 World Championship: 2005

References

External links 
César Villaluz Stats

Football Database Provides Profile and Statistics for Cesar Villaluz

1988 births
Living people
Mexico international footballers
Mexico under-20 international footballers
Mexico youth international footballers
Association football midfielders
Cruz Azul footballers
San Luis F.C. players
Chiapas F.C. footballers
Liga MX players
Footballers from Mexico City
Mexican footballers